Andre Davis (born September 1, 1993) is an American football wide receiver who is currently a wide receiver for the Tampa Bay Tornadoes. He played college football at South Florida and has played for the Tampa Bay Buccaneers.

Professional career

Tampa Bay Buccaneers

Davis was signed on October 28, 2015.
Davis was waived on April 29, 2016.
On May 9, 2016, Davis was re-signed by the Buccaneers.
On August 28, 2016, Davis was waived by the Buccaneers.

References

External links
Tampa Bay Buccaneers bio

Living people
American football wide receivers
Tampa Bay Buccaneers players
1993 births
South Florida Bulls football players